The 2011 St Albans City and District Council election took place on 5 May 2011 to elect members of St Albans District Council in Hertfordshire, England. One third of the council was up for election and the Liberal Democrats lost overall control of the council to no overall control.

After the election, the composition of the council was:
Conservative 29
Liberal Democrats 24
Labour 3
Green 1
Independent 1

Election result
The Liberal Democrats lost control of the council as the Conservatives came up 1 seat short of taking a majority themselves, after the Conservatives gained 5 seats from the Liberal Democrats. The Conservative gains took them to 29 of the 58 seats on the council, while the Liberal Democrats dropped to 24 seats. Meanwhile, the Green Party gained their first councillor on the council after taking 1 of the 2 seats that were contested in St Peters ward.

Following the election Conservative Julian Daly became the new leader of the council at the head of a minority administration.

Ward results

By-elections between 2011 and 2012
A by-election was held in Batchwood ward on 19 January 2012 after Liberal Democrat councillor Amanda Archer resigned from the council. The seat was gained for Labour by their former group leader Roma Mills with a majority of 607 votes over the Liberal Democrats.

References

2011 English local elections
2011
2010s in Hertfordshire